Provincial elections were held in Sindh on 10 October 2002 to elect the Provincial Assembly. The elections were held under the military government of General Pervez Musharraf.

Result

References

Elections in Sindh
2002 elections in Pakistan